Symphony Technology Group (STG) is an American private equity firm based in Menlo Park, California. Its Chairman and CEO is Dr. Romesh Wadhwani, who founded the firm in 2002.

Investments
The company has investments in the following companies:

Acquisitions
STG acquired McGraw-Hill Construction from McGraw-Hill Financial for US$320 million on September 22, 2014. The acquisition includes Engineering News-Record, Architectural Record, Dodge and Sweet's. McGraw-Hill Construction has been renamed Dodge Data & Analytics.

On February 17, 2020, Dell Technologies sold its RSA Security business to a group led by STG in an all-cash transaction for $2.075 billion.

In March 2021, STG acquired McAfee Enterprise for $4 billion. On June 2, 2021, FireEye announced the sale of key software technologies to Symphony for $1.2 billion, while retaining the services business under the Mandiant name. FireEye bought Mandiant for around the same price. On January 18, 2022, Symphony announced the launch of Trellix, an extended detection and response company, which is a combination of FireEye and the McAfee enterprise business. In January 2022, STG announced the McAfee Enterprise security service edge (SSE) business would operate as a separate company to be known as Skyhigh Security. The cloud security company is headquartered in San Jose, California, and led by CEO Gee Rittenhouse.

On January 5, 2022, EFI split off its software business, creating eProductivity Software, which was sold to STG. In March 2023, a private equity consortium led by STG agreed to acquire Momentive Global Inc. in an all-cash deal valued at $1.5billion.

Divestments
 Symphony Teleca (from the merger of Teleca and Symphony Services) was sold to Harman International Industries in 2015.

References

Financial services companies established in 2002
Companies based in Menlo Park, California
Private equity firms of the United States